Carlos Soler Barragán (born 2 January 1997) is a Spanish professional footballer who plays as a central or right midfielder for Ligue 1 club Paris Saint-Germain and the Spain national team.

Soler began his professional career at Valencia, making 226 appearances, scoring 36 goals and winning the Copa del Rey in 2019. He joined Paris Saint-Germain in 2022 for an €18 million fee.

Internationally, Soler won a silver medal with the Spanish Olympic team in the 2020 tournament. He made his senior debut in 2021 and was chosen for the 2022 FIFA World Cup.

Club career

Early career 
Born in Valencia, Soler was first introduced to football by taking shots at half-time at the age of four during games for Bonrepòs, his brother's team. Impressed by his power, the club wanted him; he was initially too shy and only joined when his grandfather gave him a Game Boy for attending. He joined hometown club Valencia's youth setup four years later in 2005, initially as a prolific striker, but later being pushed back to be an attacking midfielder and then a central midfielder.

Valencia 
Soler made his senior debut with the reserves on 3 May 2015, starting in a 1–0 Segunda División B away loss against Cornellà. He scored his first senior goal on 13 December, netting his team's second in a 2–2 draw at Badalona. The following 12 March he renewed his contract for two more years with the option of as many more, and was an unused substitute in the main squad's 2–1 home win against Athletic Bilbao for the season's UEFA Europa League.

On 10 December 2016 Soler made his first team – and La Liga – debut, replacing Mario Suárez in a 3–2 loss against Real Sociedad at the Anoeta Stadium. He scored his first goal in the category the following 21 January, netting the first in a 2–0 Valencian Community derby win against Villarreal at the Estadio de la Cerámica. He was sent off on 4 February in a 4–0 loss to Eibar at the Mestalla Stadium for a tussle with Gonzalo Escalante during a corner kick routine, conceding a penalty.

In January 2018, Soler signed his third new contract with Valencia in little over a year, tying him to the club until 2021 and increasing his release clause to €80 million. He totalled 51 appearances in 2018–19, including 13 in his debut European season in the UEFA Champions League and Europa League; he scored in group-stage wins over Young Boys and Manchester United in the former. He played seven games in the season's Copa del Rey as Valencia won their first honour for 11 years, and assisted Rodrigo's winner in the 2–1 final victory over Barcelona on 25 May 2019.

On 17 December 2019, Soler signed a four-year contract extension, keeping him at the club until 2023, with his release clause set at €150 million. The following 8 November, he scored the first hat-trick of his career in a 4–1 league win over Real Madrid, with all three goals coming from penalties; only two La Liga players had ever scored such a treble before. He finished 2020–21 as Valencia's top scorer with 12 goals, all bar one in the league season and seven from the spot.

In 2021–22, Soler was again Valencia's league top scorer with 11, joint with Gonçalo Guedes. In the Copa del Rey, he played six games and scored the opener in a 2–1 win at Cartagena in the last 32 on 5 January; he featured for all 120 minutes of the final against Real Betis and scored the first attempt in a penalty shootout that his team lost.

Paris Saint-Germain 
On 1 September 2022, Soler signed for Ligue 1 club Paris Saint-Germain (PSG) on a five-year contract. The initial transfer fee was €18 million, potentially rising by €3 million. He made his debut five days later as a late-match substitute in a 2–1 Champions League home win over Juventus, and on 18 September he played his first league game off the bench in a 1–0 win at Lyon.

International career
Soler was part of the Spanish Olympic team that took part in the delayed 2020 tournament in Japan, finishing with a silver medal. Later in August 2021, he was called up to the senior team for matches against Sweden, Georgia and Kosovo. He made his debut on 2 September away to the Swedes, scoring a volley after four minutes in a 2–1 loss, and three days later he netted again in a 4–0 win over Georgia in Badajoz. 

Luis Enrique called Soler up for the 2022 FIFA World Cup in Qatar. On 23 November, in Spain's opener against Costa Rica, he came on for Pedri after 57 minutes and scored in a 7–0 victory. In the last 16 against Morocco, he came off the bench in a goalless draw before having his attempt saved by Yassine Bounou in a penalty shootout defeat.

Personal life 
Soler started a degree in sports journalism, which he did not finish. He regularly watched the Premier League on Canal+ as a child and learned the English language.

Career statistics

Club

International

Scores and results list Spain's goal tally first, score column indicates score after each Soler goal.

Honours
Valencia
Copa del Rey: 2018–19

Spain U21
UEFA European Under-21 Championship: 2019; runner-up: 2017

Spain U23
Summer Olympic silver medal: 2020

References

External links

 Valencia official profile 
 
 
 

1997 births
Living people
Footballers from Valencia (city)
Spanish footballers
Association football midfielders
La Liga players
Segunda División B players
Ligue 1 players
Valencia CF Mestalla footballers
Valencia CF players
Paris Saint-Germain F.C. players
Spain youth international footballers
Spain under-21 international footballers
Olympic footballers of Spain
Spain international footballers
Footballers at the 2020 Summer Olympics
Olympic medalists in football
Olympic silver medalists for Spain
Medalists at the 2020 Summer Olympics
Spanish expatriate footballers
Spanish expatriate sportspeople in France
Expatriate footballers in France
2022 FIFA World Cup players